Saint Lea (died  383) is a fourth-century saint in the Roman Catholic Church based on the authority of Jerome.

Lea of Rome is known only through the testimony of her beloved friend, the learned Saint Jerome. Jerome, a scholarly monk best known for his Latin translation of the Bible (the Vulgate), is the Church's only source of information on St. Lea, whose biographical details are unknown. A noblewoman of Rome, born into wealth and privilege, she was a contemporary of Jerome. However, soon after her marriage she was widowed and left very sound financially.  Instead of retiring as a wealthy widow, however, she joined a convent of consecrated virgins in the city—shedding all the money and social standing she possessed.  In later years she was named the prioress of the convent.
Saint Lea supported the house run by Saint Marcella, working as a menial servant, and later served as the group's superior.

It appears that she died in 384 while St. Jerome and St. Marcella were reading and working on Psalm 73.  In a letter relaying her death to others within the city of Rome, St. Jerome writes to St. Marcella that St. Lea, a woman of austerity, obedience and remarkable penances had died.  He described her as “blessed,” emphasizing the woman's virtues as being worthy of heaven. Jerome provides no biography for Lea, for he assumes that Marcella knows Lea, and concentrates instead upon her virtues.

Jerome draws a parallel with parable of Lazarus and Dives:

He then compares her with a consul who had lived in wealth and would find himself in agony in the afterlife and exhorts Marcella to serve Jesus rather than the world.
Jerome ends his letter by urging Marcella to remember the lesson of St. Lea's life: 

Jerome's use of the adjective "blessed" is taken as sufficient evidence for Lea's veneration by the Roman Catholic Church, where her feast day is March 22.

The name Lea is likely a derivation of Leah coming from a Hebrew word meaning "weary"; or from a Chaldean name meaning "mistress" or "ruler" in Akkadian.  In Genesis 29, Leah is seen as being Jacob's first wife and the mother of seven of his children.

Book of Saints – Lea
 Monks of Ramsgate.ea Book of Saints, 1921.. CatholicSaints.Info. 4 November 2014. Web. 12 January 2018. st lea is the patrion saint of obedience

See also
 Saint Lea, patron saint archive

References

380s deaths
Italian Roman Catholic saints